WIYC (channel 48) is a television station licensed to Troy, Alabama, United States, serving the Montgomery area as an affiliate of Cozi TV. It is owned by Woods Communications Corporation alongside Fox affiliate WCOV-TV (channel 20) and low-power local weather station WALE-LD (channel 17). The stations share studios on WCOV Avenue in the Normandale section of Montgomery, while WIYC's transmitter is located on County Road 37 in rural Bullock County.

History

The station came on the air on November 24, 2000 as WRJM-TV, an affiliate of the United Paramount Network (UPN). Following the announcement of the merger between UPN and The WB to form The CW, WRJM signed an affiliation agreement with News Corporation's new upstart programming service, MyNetworkTV. The station made the switch between affiliations on MyNetworkTV's first day of broadcast, September 5, 2006. In addition to MyNetworkTV programming, WRJM-TV showed traditional syndicated fare, local programming, and sports, including Troy University and high school sports.

In February 2008, the station went into receivership after defaulting on a $2.9 million loan to Citizens Bank. WRJM received an extension of time to construct its previously approved digital facilities, through November 19, 2008.

Bankruptcy receiver Walter P. Lunsford filed with the Federal Communications Commission (FCC) that the station is being offered for sale. He noted that any new owner would be responsible for construction of WRJM's digital facilities, since no construction has taken place due to the station's financial condition.

On January 16, 2009, Southern Venture Capital Group began operating WRJM via a local marketing agreement; on April 20, SVCG entered an agreement to purchase the station outright for $3 million. In August 2009 SVCG assigned the LMA and purchase agreement to Artists and Fans Network, Inc.

In April 2009, the station ceased to carry MyNetworkTV programming; at the time, the station cited satellite problems and a need to reconfigure the station's equipment for its digital transition (though the station has also since dropped all syndicated programming, in favor of The Country Network (TCN), a subchannel featuring country music videos and performances). That May, WRJM suffered a lightning strike, forcing the station to end analog transmission; the station then ordered equipment to convert to digital. It would not be until 2014 when MyNetworkTV found another affiliate, low-powered WDSF-LD, which serves the immediate Montgomery area. Since WRJM's disaffiliation, most area cable systems carried WABM from the adjacent Birmingham market.

The station changed its call letters to WIYC in November 2009.

In 2011, WIYC dropped TCN in favor of WeatherNation, a weather information network similar to The Weather Channel. It then changed affiliates again in 2013, this time affiliating with Cozi TV.

On November 15, 2017, Neal Ardman filed to sell WIYC to Woods Communications Corporation for $1 million. The sale would create a duopoly with Fox affiliate WCOV-TV (channel 20); as Montgomery does not have enough television stations to permit a legal duopoly, Woods sought a failing station waiver for the purchase. The sale was completed on April 3, 2018.

In 2020, MyNetworkTV reaffiliated with WIYC, sharing 48.2 with Decades.

Pending sale to Allen Media Group
On December 15, 2021, it was announced that Allen Media Group, a subsidiary of Los Angeles-based Entertainment Studios, would purchase WIYC, WCOV-TV and WALE-LD for $28.5 million, pending FCC approval; at the time, the deal was expected to close in the first half of 2022.

Subchannels
The station's digital signal is multiplexed:

References

External links

Television channels and stations established in 2000
2000 establishments in Alabama
IYC
Cozi TV affiliates
Decades (TV network) affiliates
MyNetworkTV affiliates
Heroes & Icons affiliates
Court TV affiliates
TBD (TV network) affiliates
Comet (TV network) affiliates
Charge! (TV network) affiliates